Proteas, son of Andronicus of Olynthus and Lanike, was a syntrophos and hetairos of Alexander the Great. Antipater sent him with fifteen ships to protect the Greek islands and mainland against Persian attack. Putting in at Chalcis on Euboea, he advanced to Cythnus, and then caught the Persian admiral Datames at Siphnos at dawn, capturing eight of his ten ships. Proteas came with a penteconter from Macedon to join Alexander at Sidon. Like Hegelochus, who served with the fleet, Proteas soon joined Alexander's expedition, and accompanied him by land from at least Egypt. He was a notorious drinking companion of Alexander.

References
Who's Who in the Age of Alexander the Great Edited by: Waldemar Heckel 

Hetairoi
Admirals of Alexander the Great
Generals of Alexander the Great
Ancient Macedonian admirals
Ancient Macedonian generals
4th-century BC Greek people